Diego Ariel Duarte Garcete (born 8 April 2002) is a Paraguayan footballer who plays as a forward for Club Olimpia.

Career statistics

Club

Notes

References

2002 births
Living people
Association football forwards
Paraguayan footballers
Paraguay youth international footballers
Paraguayan Primera División players
Club Olimpia footballers